The Madison Carnegie Library or Madison Public Library, located at 401 Sixth Avenue, Madison, in the U.S. state of Minnesota is a public library building built in 1905 of brick with limestone trim. Its characteristic features include a columned and pedimented main entrance and a small polygonal dome on its flat roof. The structure was built with an $8,000 grant from Andrew Carnegie. This was one of over 3,000 libraries in 47 states funded by Carnegie. Local residents gave an additional $1,000 in gifts and books at its dedication on January 22, 1906. Gerhard Herriges, a contractor for public buildings in Western Minnesota, built the building for $6,216.85.

References

Buildings and structures in Lac qui Parle County, Minnesota
Carnegie libraries in Minnesota
Education in Lac qui Parle County, Minnesota
Libraries on the National Register of Historic Places in Minnesota
Library buildings completed in 1905
Public libraries in Minnesota
National Register of Historic Places in Lac qui Parle County, Minnesota
1905 establishments in Minnesota